Germán Pedro Ibáñez (October 11, 1928 in Las Villas, Cuba – August 9, 2007 in Havana, Cuba) was the musical director of one of the oldest musical groups from Cuba, the Septeto Habanero.

Ibáñez conducted the group for over four decades, with which he recorded some 50 albums and that he enriched with songs that showed his passion for the son cubano. The Septeto Habanero, whose members are regarded as "the parents of Son Cubano" is a legendary Cuban orchestra that emerged in 1920, first as a sextet.

The group were the first to record in New York City the son in 1925, which made the son fashionable. Ibáñez joined the Septeto Habanero in 1964 and during his lifetime he received numerous awards, including the Distinción por la Cultura Nacional (Distinction by the National Culture), and the medal Alejo Carpentier.

External links
 Cuba Encuentro article
 Cuba Net article
 Milenio article
 
 Terra.Com article
 La Luz 92 article

1928 births
2007 deaths
Cuban guitarists
Cuban bandleaders
Cuban songwriters
Male songwriters
20th-century guitarists
20th-century male musicians
Cuban male guitarists